Hapoel Ground, Petah Tikva was a football stadium in Petah Tikva, on Abravanel street. The ground was in use between 1940 and 1967, when the team moved to the Municipal Stadium.

See also
Sports in Israel

References

Defunct football venues in Israel
Hapoel Petah Tikva F.C.
Sports venues in Petah Tikva